Ashtabula is a city in Ohio.

Ashtabula may also refer to:

Places
Ashtabula Township, Barnes County, North Dakota
Lake Ashtabula, a reservoir in North Dakota
Ashtabula County, Ohio
Ashtabula Township, Ashtabula County, Ohio
Ashtabula River, a river in Ohio
Ashtabula (Pendleton, South Carolina), a plantation house

Other uses
Ashtabula, a ferry on Lake Erie
Ashtabula (spider), a genus of jumping spiders
Ashtabula, Carson and Jefferson Railroad
Ashtabula crank, a component of a bicycle bottom bracket
, a US Navy fleet oiler